Miss Polonia 2005 was the 31st Miss Polonia pageant, held on September 2, 2005. The winner was Malwina Ratajczak of Opole and she represented Poland in Miss World 2005 and Miss Baltic Sea 2006. Top 5 finalist Marta Jakoniuk represented Poland Miss International 2006. Top 5 finalist Francys Mayela Barraza Sudnicka represented the country at both Miss Universe 2006 and Miss Earth 2006.

Final results

Special Awards

Official Delegates

Notes

Did not compete
 Kuyavia-Pomerania
 Łódź
 Lower Poland
 Lubusz
 Pomerania
 Subcarpathia
 Polish Community in Argentina
 Polish Community in Australia
 Polish Community in Belarus
 Polish Community in Brazil
 Polish Community in Canada
 Polish Community in France
 Polish Community in Ireland
 Polish Community in Israel
 Polish Community in Russia
 Polish Community in South Africa
 Polish Community in Ukraine
 Polish Community in the U.K.
 Polish Community in the U.S. — Anna Roszkowska, Miss Polonia USA; participated as a special guest and member of the Judges.

References

External links
Official Website

2005
2005 beauty pageants
2005 in Poland